Diamond Head Lighthouse is a United States Coast Guard facility located on Diamond Head in Honolulu, on the island of Oahu in the State of Hawaii.

The lighthouse was listed on the National Register of Historic Places in 1980.

The Diamond Head Lighthouse was featured on a United States postage stamp in June 2007.

In a 2014 interview, 94-year-old veteran Melvin Bell described serving as the radio operator at the Diamond Head station during the Japanese sneak attack on Pearl Harbor, and the steps he took to warn civilian vessels of the attack.

The lighthouse is featured in the music video for Katy Perry's song Electric, which is a collaboration between Perry and Pokémon.

See also
List of lighthouses in Hawaii

References

External links

Lighthouses on the National Register of Historic Places in Hawaii
Buildings and structures in Honolulu
History of Oahu
Lighthouses completed in 1917
1917 establishments in Hawaii
National Register of Historic Places in Honolulu